is a 1966 kaiju film directed by Tetsuya Yamanochi and produced and distributed by Toei Company, loosely adapting the Japanese story of Jiraiya.

Plot
The Oumi Kingdom, ruled peacefully by Lord Ogata (Shinichiro Hayashi), was raided by his corrupt general Daijo Yuki (Bin Amatsu), who was assisted by an evil ninja named Orochimaru (Ryūtarō Ōtomo), who slew the lord and his wife, who in turn trusted their young son Ikazuchi-Maru to their soldiers, who escaped the kingdom in a small boat. Orochimaru goes after them, transforming into a giant serpent. He sank the boat and almost succeeded in killing Ikazuchi-Maru, until a giant eagle flew in, injured Orochimaru, and saved the young boy.

Years later, Ikazuchi-Maru (Matsukata Hiroki), now a young man, has mastered the art of ninjutsu and toad magic, thanks to an old hermit named Dojin Hiki (Nobuo Kaneko). When a band of ninja sent by Daijo Yuki try to attack Ikazuchi-Maru, the young ninja puts his skills to the test. Along the way, he meets a beautiful young girl named Tsunade (Tomoko Ogawa), with whom he becomes friends with. Meanwhile, Hiki is confronted by Orochimaru, who turns out to be an old apprentice of his! Hiki also turned out to be the giant eagle that saved the young Ikazuchi-Maru and gave his former pupil a scar on his head (when he was in serpent form). Orochimaru then attacks the old master with ninja magic and poisons him. Ikazuchi-Maru and Tsunade return almost too late, as the dying Hiki tells him all he needs to know about Orochimaru, telling his pupil to avenge his death. And just before he dies, he reacts to Tsunade in shock, as though he realized something about her. Before setting out on his mission to avenge his master, Ikazuchi-Maru says farewell to Tsunade, who is taken care of by an old "spider" woman (Sen Hara), who tells her to follow the young man. She gives the young woman a spider hairpin, with which she can summon a giant spider, but she can do so only once, lest the giant spider will turn on her if used more than once.

The course of Ikazuchi-Maru's journey has him befriending a girl named Saki (Yumi Suzumura) and her little brother Shirota (Takao Iwamura), whose village was oppressed by Daijo Yuki's men. Yuki himself tries to execute Saki and Shirota for treason, only to be attacked by Ikazuchi-Maru, who proclaims himself to be the invincible ninja "Jiraiya"! Demanding revenge against Yuki for the murder of his parents and the overthrow of his kingdom, Jiraiya is then confronted by Orochimaru, whom he duels with spectacular ninja magic. We also learn of a shocking secret about Tsunade; She is the daughter of Orochimaru! Her father urges her to kill Jiraiya with poison (after a hired assassin failed to kill him also). After these failed attempts on his life, Jiraiya sets out to rescue Saki and Shirota from Yuki (who was in the midst of celebrating with his kingdom). He transforms into a giant toad, rampaging Yuki's stronghold. Orochimaru confronts Jiraiya in his powerful giant serpent form, and a spectacular showdown between two giant magical forces ensues.

Release
The Magic Serpent was released in Japan in 1966. The film was never released theatrically in the United States, but released directly to television by American International Television in 1968 with an 86-minute running time.

Footnotes

References

External links
 Kairyū Daikessen at the Internet Movie Database
 

1966 films
Films about dragons
Kaiju films
Martial arts fantasy films
Ninja films
Toei tokusatsu films
Japanese fantasy adventure films
1960s Japanese films